Sailing was contested at the 2019 Summer Universiade from 8 to 12 July 2019 at the Circolo Italia in Naples.

Singapore won its second ever medal at the Universiade in this event.

Medal summary

Medal table

Events

References

External links
2019 Summer Universiade – Sailing
Results book – Sailing (Archived version)

Universiade
2019 Summer Universiade events
Sailing at the Summer Universiade